The 1943 St. Louis Browns season involved the Browns finishing 6th in the American League with a record of 72 wins and 80 losses.

Offseason
 November 7, 1942: Hal Epps was drafted by the Browns from the St. Louis Cardinals in the 1942 minor league draft.
 February 1, 1943: Paul Dean, brother of Browns broadcaster Dizzy Dean, was purchased by the Browns from the Washington Senators.

Regular season

Season standings

Record vs. opponents

Roster

Player stats

Batting

Starters by position
Note: Pos = Position; G = Games played; AB = At bats; H = Hits; Avg. = Batting average; HR = Home runs; RBI = Runs batted in

Other batters
Note: G = Games played; AB = At bats; H = Hits; Avg. = Batting average; HR = Home runs; RBI = Runs batted in

Pitching

Starting pitchers
Note: G = Games pitched; IP = Innings pitched; W = Wins; L = Losses; ERA = Earned run average; SO = Strikeouts

Other pitchers
Note: G = Games pitched; IP = Innings pitched; W = Wins; L = Losses; ERA = Earned run average; SO = Strikeouts

Relief pitchers
Note: G = Games pitched; W = Wins; L = Losses; SV = Saves; ERA = Earned run average; SO = Strikeouts

Farm system

Awards and honors
Vern Stephens, American League All-Star

References

External links
1943 St. Louis Browns team page at Baseball Reference
1943 St. Louis Browns season at baseball-almanac.com

St. Louis Browns seasons
Saint Louis Browns season
St Louis Browns